Statistics of Kuwaiti Premier League for the 2006–07 season.

Overview
It was contested by 8 teams, and Al Kuwait Kaifan won the championship.

League standings

Championship playoff
Al Kuwait Kaifan 2-0 Kazma Sporting Club

References
Kuwait - List of final tables (RSSSF)

Kuwait Premier League seasons
Kuwait
1